The 1999 German Open was a men's tennis tournament played on outdoor clay courts. It was the 93rd edition of the Hamburg Masters (German Open), and was part of the ATP Super 9 of the 1999 ATP Tour. It took place at the Rothenbaum Tennis Center in Hamburg, Germany, from through 3 May through 10 May 1999.

Finals

Singles

 Marcelo Ríos defeated  Mariano Zabaleta 6–7(5–7), 7–5, 5–7, 7–6(7–5), 6–2
It was Marcelo Ríos' 1st title of the year, and his 13th overall. It was his 1st Masters title of the year, and his 5th overall.

Doubles

 Wayne Arthurs /  Andrew Kratzmann defeated  Paul Haarhuis /  Jared Palmer 4–6, 7–6(7–5), 6–4

References

External links
   
 ATP tournament profile

 
German Open
Hamburg European Open
ATP German Open